Allegheny Market House was located in the Allegheny Center neighborhood of Pittsburgh, Pennsylvania, and was built in 1863.  It was built at a time when this area was part of the city of Allegheny, Pennsylvania.  Even though the market house was demolished in 1966, the former site of the building was added to the List of Pittsburgh History and Landmarks Foundation Historic Landmarks in 1979.

References

Commercial buildings in Pittsburgh
Buildings and structures demolished in 1966
Commercial buildings completed in 1863
Pittsburgh History & Landmarks Foundation Historic Landmarks